The Girl's balance beam event final for the 2014 Summer Youth Olympics took place on the 24th of August at the Nanjing Olympic Sports Center Gymnasium.

Medalists

Qualification

The top eight gymnasts from qualification advanced into the final.

Final results

Reserves
The following gymnasts were reserves for the balance beam final.

References

Gymnastics at the 2014 Summer Youth Olympics